The 2007–08 Elite Ice Hockey League season began September 5, 2007 and ran until April 6, 2008. It was the fifth season of Elite League competition.

The defending league champions were the Coventry Blaze, who were also the holders of the Challenge Cup. The Nottingham Panthers looked to defend the Play Off Championship they won for the first time in eighteen years in 2007.

Movements between Elite League teams

Charity Shield

The season began on September 5, 2007 with a "Charity Shield" style game between the 2006–07 league champions and Challenge Cup winning Coventry Blaze and the playoff champions Nottingham Panthers at the National Ice Centre. The Panthers defeated the Blaze 7-6 to win the inaugural event.

Challenge Cup

For the preliminary round, teams were divided into two groups of five with teams playing each of their opponents once with two homes games and two away games. The home and away games for each club were determined by a random draw. The top two in each group advanced to the semi finals of the competition.

Group stage

Group A

Group B

Semi-finals

Winner A (Nottingham) vs Runner Up B (Newcastle)

Winner B (Sheffield) vs Runner Up A (Cardiff)

Final

League

Playoffs

Footnotes

Elite Ice Hockey League seasons
1
United